IFRA may refer to:
 IFRA (publishing), an international organisation for the publishing industry
 International Fragrance Association